Cortland County Airport , is located west of Cortland, New York, United States. It was formerly named Cortland Municipal Airport.

Facilities and aircraft

For the 12-month period ending September 10, 2009, the airport had 17,155 aircraft operations, an average of 47 per day: 66% local general aviation, and 34% transient general aviation. At that time there were 38 aircraft based at this airport: 90% single-engine, 5% multi-engine and 5% helicopter.

References

Airports in New York (state)
Buildings and structures in Cortland County, New York